Molly Brett (1902–1990) was an English illustrator and writer of children's literature, best known for her anthropomorphic artwork.

Biography

Molly (Mary Elizabeth) Brett grew up in Surrey, Great Britain, surrounded by animals and nature. Her mother, Mary Gould Brett, was a respected animal painter who encouraged her daughter to paint from life, and this is reflected in Molly's gift for making her animals look thoroughly naturalistic while giving them human characteristics and activities. And like Beatrix Potter, her artwork also reflects her great observational powers in depicting nature, especially notable in her woodland illustrations.

Molly began her art training with a correspondence course in illustration, followed by formal instruction at Press Art School and the Guildford Art School. It was at Guildford that she met Margaret Tarrant (also destined to attain substantial fame as an illustrator), who soon became a close friend and lived with her in Cornwall. She began her career by illustrating "weekly papers" for children. One of her earliest commissions was to illustrate stories by Enid Blyton. Inspired by this, she went on to write and illustrate 21 books of her own for the Medici Society of London, with whom she was associated for sixty years. Medici has published over 500 of her paintings as postcards, greeting cards and prints.

Molly Brett's work has enchanted generations of children with its beautifully drawn details, subtle colours and magical atmosphere. Her work follows in the tradition of other twentieth-century "dressed animal" illustrators such as Beatrix Potter, Margaret Tempest, Racey Helps, and others.

Bibliography 

Brett's books include:

 A surprise for Dumpy
 Flip Flop's Secret
 Goodnight Time Tales
 Jiggy's Treasure Hunt
 Midget and the Pet Shop
 Paddy Gets into Mischief
 Plush and Tatty on the Beach
 Teddy Flies Away
 The Japanese Garden
 The Forgotten Bear
 The Hare in a Hurry
 The Jumble Bears
 The Magic Spectacles and Other Tales
 The Party That Grew
 The Runaway Fairy
 The Story of a Toy Car
 The Untidy Little Hedgehog
 Tom Tit Moves House

References 

 Molly Brett, accessed February 11, 2011
 The Fairy Cottage, accessed February 11, 2011.

1902 births
1990 deaths
British children's book illustrators
British children's writers
Enid Blyton illustrators
British women illustrators
People from Surrey
Alumni of the University for the Creative Arts
British women children's writers
20th-century British women writers
20th-century English writers
20th-century English women artists